Tuda Murphy (born 4 November 1980) is a Caymanian footballer. Besides Cayman Islands, he has played in Northern Ireland.

International career
He also won numbers of caps for Cayman Islands, and most recently the World Cup qualifier match, draw with Bermuda on 3 February 2008 and 1–3 lost in return legs.

Honours
 Nigel O'Hara Diamond Jewellers Player of the Month:1
November 2009 
 Alan Steele Player of the Season Award:1
2008
 William Walker Award:1
2008
 Stewards Award:1
2008

References

External links

1980 births
Living people
Caymanian footballers
Cayman Islands international footballers
Caymanian expatriate footballers
Glenavon F.C. players
Portadown F.C. players
NIFL Premiership players
Association football goalkeepers
Bodden Town F.C. players
Expatriate association footballers in Northern Ireland
George Town SC players
Donegal Celtic F.C. players